Syed Misri Shah Rizvi(18401905), also called Syed Misri Shah Imam and known as King of Kaafi poetry, was a saint and a sufi poet. He was born in Nasarpur, Sindh and lived most of his life in Nasarpur after travelling throughout the world to spread the word of Islam and Sufism. His poetry is divided into seven different languages, and most of them are in Sindhi. The others are Hindi, Persian and few others as well. The annual Urs of Syed Misri Shah takes place in Safar (Islamic Month) In Nasarpur, Sindh, Pakistan.

See also
Sufism

External links
 About Hazrat Misri Shah Imam 
  Misri Imam Shah

1840 births
Sufi poets
Sufis of Sindh
Sufism in Sindh
Sindhi people
Poets in British India
1905 deaths
19th-century poets